Hodgskin is a surname. Notable people with the surname include:

Natalie Hodgskin (born 1976), Australian softball player
Ryan Hodgskin (born 1977), South African footballer
Thomas Hodgskin (1787–1869), English socialist writer

See also
Hodgkin

Surnames from given names